The LaMoure County Courthouse in LaMoure, North Dakota was built in 1907.  It was designed by architects Buechner & Orth in Beaux Arts style.  It was listed on the National Register of Historic Places (NRHP) in 1980.

The structure includes a highly detailed, metal-covered dome with bull's eye windows topped by a ball finial.  An octagonal tower with columns and arched windows supports the dome.  The front facade features four large Corinithian columns.

References

Courthouses on the National Register of Historic Places in North Dakota
County courthouses in North Dakota
Beaux-Arts architecture in North Dakota
Government buildings completed in 1907
National Register of Historic Places in LaMoure County, North Dakota
1907 establishments in North Dakota
Government buildings with domes